Loch Doine  is a small freshwater loch that lies to the west of Balquhidder in the Trossachs and Teith ward within Stirling council area of Scotland. It is a short, narrow loch. It is separated from Loch Voil to the east by a small channel. The Loch can be reached by a small single track road from Balquhidder leading to Inverlochlarig.

References 

Voil
Voil
LVoil